Hardin County is a county located in the central part of the U.S. state of Kentucky. Its county seat is Elizabethtown. The county was formed in 1792. Hardin County is part of the Elizabethtown-Fort Knox, KY Metropolitan Statistical Area, as well as the Louisville/Jefferson County—Elizabethtown-Bardstown, KY-IN Combined Statistical Area. As of the 2020 census, the population was 110,702.

Hardin County is known for being the birthplace of former U.S. president Abraham Lincoln, though the location is now part of neighboring LaRue County.

History
Hardin County was established in 1792 from land partitioned from Nelson County. Hardin was the 15th Kentucky county in order of formation.
The county is named for Col. John Hardin, a Continental Army officer during the American Revolution and a brother of the Capt. William Hardin who founded Hardinsburg.

Courthouse fires destroyed county records in 1864 and again in 1932. The present courthouse dates from 1934.

Geography
It is the fourth-largest county by area in Kentucky.

Adjacent counties
Hardin County borders nine counties, more than any other county in Kentucky.

 Louisville-Jefferson County (northeast)
 Bullitt County  (northeast)
 Nelson County  (east)
 LaRue County  (southeast)
 Hart County  (south//CST Border)
 Grayson County  (southwest/CST Border)
 Breckinridge County  (west/CST Border)
 Meade County  (northwest)
 Harrison County, Indiana (north)

Demographics

As of the census of 2010, there were 105,543 people, 39,853 households, and 28,288 families residing in the county. The racial makeup of the county was 80.5% White (77.8% non-Hispanic), 11.6% Black or African American, 0.5% Native American or Alaska Native, 2.0% Asian, 0.2% Pacific Islander, 1.5% from other races, and 3.5% from two or more races. Hispanics or Latinos of any race were 5.0% of the population.

There were 39,853 households, out of which 37.2% had children under the age of 18 living with them, 53.3% were married couples living together, 12.9% had a female householder with no husband present, 4.7% had a male householder with no wife present, and 29.0% were non-families. 24.5% of all households were made up of individuals, and 8.0% had someone living alone who was 65 years of age or older.  The average household size was 2.57 and the average family size was 3.04.

The age distribution was 25.97% under 18, 9.93% from 18 to 24, 27.50% from 25 to 44, 25.60% from 45 to 64, and 11.00% who were 65 years of age or older.  The median age was 35.0 years. For every 100 females, there were 100.41 males.  For every 100 females age 18 and over, there were 102.54 males.

Complete economic data from the 2010 Census has not yet been released. According to the 2010 Census, the median income for a household in the county was $43,421, and the median income for a family was $55,151. The per capita income for the county was $23,744. Remaining economic data is from the 2000 Census. At that time, males had a median income of $30,743 versus $22,688 for females. About 8.20% of families and 10.00% of the population were below the poverty line, including 13.50% of those under age 18 and 8.60% of those age 65 or over.

Economy

The economy of Hardin County is largely dominated by the adjacent Fort Knox Military Installation.

The Army Human Resource Center, the largest construction project in the history of Fort Knox, began in November 2007. As many as 2,100 new permanent human resources, information technology, and administrative white-collar civilian professionals will be working there.

Officials expect that as many as 12,000 people, including the families of soldiers and civilian workers to relocate to the area as a result of the Fort Knox realignment of 2005.

Approximately $1 billion in new federal and state construction, and infrastructure funds were committed to Fort Knox, and in the surrounding areas by the end of 2011 for Fort Knox realignment of 2005.

Gov. Steve Beshear of Kentucky announced the creation of a task force to help Hardin County, and the surrounding counties prepare for the Fort Knox realignment. The group is "designed to meet specific needs" in areas such as transportation, economic development, education, water and sewer availability, and area wide planning.

Hardin County is classified by the Kentucky Department of Alcoholic Beverage Control (ABC) as both a moist county and a "limited dry county". Under ABC terminology, a "moist county" is an otherwise dry county in which at least one city has voted to allow sale of alcoholic beverages for off-premises consumption. The word "limited" means that at least one city within the county, or the county as a whole, has voted to allow alcohol sales in qualifying restaurants. In the case of Hardin County, Elizabethtown, Radcliff, and Vine Grove all voted to allow off-premises sales in October 2011. West Point has voted to allow sale of alcohol by the drink in restaurants that seat at least 50 and derive at least 70% of their revenue from food (including non-alcoholic beverages).

Government
The formal government structure of Hardin County consists of a Fiscal Court along with six incorporated cities.  Elizabethtown is the county seat.  In 2010, the Hardin County Government, led by Hardin County Judge/Executive Harry Berry, commissioned a study entitled, "Hardin County Vision Project," in part to explore the benefits of consolidated government in the county.  The growth of the area and the changes expected due to the realignment of Fort Knox led to the study.  Hardin County United, a volunteer-led organization, was established to consider the findings of this project and develop recommendations for the future of government in the county.

Law enforcement and property tax collection are provided by the Hardin County Sheriff's Office.

Education

K-12

Two public school districts operate in the county.
 The Hardin County Schools, headquartered in a portion of Radcliff that has an Elizabethtown mailing address, serve K–12 students in most of the county, with the exception of (most of) Elizabethtown and Fort Knox. The district operates 13 elementary schools, five middle schools, and three high schools, plus one alternative school for middle and high school grades. In July 2020, the former West Point Independent School District, which operated a single K–8 school serving the West Point area (cut off from the rest of the county by Fort Knox), closed and merged into the Hardin County district after long-term declines in enrollment.
 The Elizabethtown Independent Schools serve students in most of the city of Elizabethtown; however, some areas are instead served by the Hardin County district. The district operates three elementary schools, one middle school, and one high school. Before the closure of the West Point district, that area's high school students attended Elizabethtown High under a contract between the two districts. West Point students that had attended Elizabethtown High under that contract may complete their high school education there; the last such students are expected to graduate in 2023.

Fort Knox however is assigned to the Department of Defense Education Activity (DoDEA), which, through its Domestic Dependent Elementary and Secondary Schools subagency, operates four schools on the Fort Knox base for military dependents. DDESS has one elementary school (grades K-5), one intermediate school (1–5), one middle school (6–8), and one high school (9–12) on base. After the Army inactivated a combat brigade, resulting in the relocation of 3,500 soldiers and their families from the base, DoDEA closed four other schools—three elementary schools and one intermediate school—at the end of the 2013–14 school year. At that time, DoDEA also restructured the grades at all of the remaining schools except the high school. A new $16-million Fort Knox High School, a two-story, state-of-the-art facility that united the existing vocational school with the current gymnasium, creating a connected campus was completed in 2008, with dedication on August 7, 2008. The remaining parts of the old high school were then demolished.

Five private schools also operate in the county, St. James Catholic School (Roman Catholic Archdiocese of Louisville), Gloria Dei Lutheran School (LCMS), Elizabethtown Christian Academy, North Hardin Christian School, and Hardin Christian Academy.

Postsecondary education
Elizabethtown is home to Elizabethtown Community and Technical College, a member of the Kentucky Community and Technical College System.
 Elizabethtown Community and Technical College -- Home Page

Communities

Cities

 Elizabethtown (county seat)
 Muldraugh (partly in Meade County)
 Radcliff
 Sonora
 Upton (partly in LaRue County)
 Vine Grove
 West Point

Census-designated places
 Cecilia
 Fort Knox, a military base (partly in Meade County and Bullitt County, although all of the base housing is in Hardin County)
 Rineyville

Unincorporated communities

 Big Spring (partly in Breckinridge County in the Central Time Zone and Meade County in the Eastern Time Zone)
 Blue Ball
 Colesburg
 Dever Hollow
 Eastview
 Glendale
 Harcourt
 Howell Spring
 Hardin Springs
 Howe Valley
 Mill Creek
 New Fruit
 Nolin
 Old Stephensburg
 Quaker Valley
 Red Mills
 St. John
 Star Mills
 Stephensburg
 Summitt
 Tip Top
 Tunnel Hill
 Vertrees
 White Mills
 Youngers Creek

See also

 Louisville/Jefferson County–Elizabethtown–Bardstown, KY-IN Combined Statistical Area
 National Register of Historic Places listings in Hardin County, Kentucky

References

 
Kentucky counties
Kentucky counties on the Ohio River
Elizabethtown metropolitan area
1792 establishments in Kentucky
Populated places established in 1792